Neil Maxwell Robson AM (5 July 1928 – 14 December 2013) was a Tasmanian member of parliament from 1976 to 1992. He was a Liberal member in the House of Assembly division of Bass.

Robson is known for championing the introduction of a system of rotating the order of names printed on ballot papers at elections, often known as the Robson Rotation.

Early life
Robson was born in Smithton, Tasmania in July 1928. His father was a saddler, builder and undertaker from Sheffield, who was also a World War I veteran. He died in Roma, Queensland—three months after Robson's birth—after contracting tuberculosis. His mother was from England, and moved to Smithton with her father after his retirement from the British Army. In 1941, Robson won a scholarship to attend Launceston Church Grammar School.

Military service
In 1944, Robson attempted to enlist in the Royal Australian Navy, although he was a year under the minimum age of seventeen, and his mother refused to provide a statutory declaration claiming he was old enough. On 15 August 1945, he enlisted and was trained at Flinders Naval Depot and posted to the naval base . He gained a posting aboard  by asking the captain for one, and served with the British Commonwealth Occupation Force in Papua New Guinea and Japan in the aftermath of World War II.

Banking career
After leaving the navy, Robson refused a university place, to his later regret. He worked for many years at the Launceston Savings Bank (LSB), whilst completing an accounting degree as a correspondence course.

Personal life
Robson married Desiree Tyson in May 1949, and they had three children: Jill, Paul and Jan.

Honours
On Australia Day 2007, he was made a Member of the Order of Australia for "service to electoral reform through the voting system, to the Tasmanian Parliament, and to fishing and community organisations". He was also a member of Mensa International.

Publications

References

External links
 

1928 births
2013 deaths
Members of the Tasmanian House of Assembly
Liberal Party of Australia members of the Parliament of Tasmania
Members of the Order of Australia
Recipients of the Centenary Medal
Royal Australian Navy sailors
Royal Australian Navy personnel of World War II
Mensans
Australian people of English descent
People from Smithton, Tasmania